Negative capability is a phrase first used by Romantic poet John Keats in 1817 to explain the capacity of the greatest writers (particularly Shakespeare) to pursue a vision of artistic beauty even when it leads them into intellectual confusion and uncertainty, as opposed to a preference for philosophical certainty over artistic beauty. The term has been used by poets and philosophers to describe the ability to perceive and recognise truths beyond the reach of consecutive reasoning.

Keats: The poet's turn of phrase
Keats used the phrase only briefly in a private letter, and it became known only after his correspondence was collected and published.  In a letter to his brothers, George and Thomas, on 22 December 1817, Keats described a conversation he had been engaged in a few days previously:

I had not a dispute but a disquisition with Dilke, upon various subjects; several things dove-tailed in my mind, and at once it struck me what quality went to form a Man of Achievement, especially in Literature, and which Shakespeare possessed so enormously—I mean Negative Capability, that is, when a man is capable of being in uncertainties, mysteries, doubts, without any irritable reaching after fact and reason—Coleridge, for instance, would let go by a fine isolated verisimilitude caught from the Penetralium of mystery, from being incapable of remaining content with half-knowledge. This pursued through volumes would perhaps take us no further than this, that with a great poet the sense of Beauty overcomes every other consideration, or rather obliterates all consideration.

Samuel Taylor Coleridge was, by 1817, a frequent target of criticism by the younger poets of Keats's generation, often ridiculed for his infatuation with German idealistic philosophy.  Against Coleridge's obsession with philosophical truth, Keats sets up the model of Shakespeare, whose poetry articulated various points of view and never advocated a particular vision of truth.

Keats's ideas here, as was usually the case in his letters, were expressed tersely with no effort to fully expound what he meant, but passages from other letters enlarge on the same theme.  In a letter to J.H. Reynolds in February 1818, he wrote:

We hate poetry that has a palpable design upon us—and if we do not agree, seems to put its hand in its breeches pocket. Poetry should be great & unobtrusive, a thing which enters into one's soul, and does not startle it or amaze it with itself but with its subject.

In another letter to Reynolds the following May, he contrived the metaphor of 'the chamber of maiden thought' and the notion of the 'burden of mystery', which together express much the same idea as that of negative capability:

I compare human life to a large Mansion of Many Apartments, two of which I can only describe, the doors of the rest being as yet shut upon me—The first we step into we call the infant or thoughtless Chamber, in which we remain as long as we do not think—We remain there a long while, and notwithstanding the doors of the second Chamber remain wide open, showing a bright appearance, we care not to hasten to it; but are at length imperceptibly impelled by the awakening of the thinking principle—within us—we no sooner get into the second Chamber, which I shall call the Chamber of Maiden-Thought, than we become intoxicated with the light and the atmosphere, we see nothing but pleasant wonders, and think of delaying there for ever in delight: However among the effects [which] this breathing is father of is that tremendous one of sharpening one's vision into the heart and nature of Man—of convincing ones nerves that the World is full of Misery and Heartbreak, Pain, Sickness, and oppression—whereby This Chamber of Maiden Thought becomes gradually darken'd and at the same time on all sides of it many doors are set open—but all dark—all leading to dark passages—We see not the balance of good and evil.  We are in a Mist—We are now in that state—We feel the 'burden of the Mystery,' To this point was Wordsworth come, as far as I can conceive when he wrote 'Tintern Abbey' and it seems to me that his Genius is explorative of those dark Passages.  Now if we live, and go on thinking, we too shall explore them.  he is a Genius and superior to us, in so far as he can, more than we, make discoveries, and shed a light in them—Here I must think Wordsworth is deeper than Milton[.]

Keats understood Coleridge as searching for a single, higher-order truth or solution to the mysteries of the natural world. He went on to find the same fault in Dilke and Wordsworth. All these poets, he claimed, lacked objectivity and universality in their view of the human condition and the natural world. In each case, Keats found a mind which was a narrow private path, not a "thoroughfare for all thoughts". Lacking for Keats were the central and indispensable qualities requisite for flexibility and openness to the world, or what he referred to as negative capability.

This concept of negative capability is precisely a rejection of set philosophies and preconceived systems of nature. He demanded that the poet be receptive rather than searching for fact or reason, and to not seek absolute knowledge of every truth, mystery, or doubt.

Keat's concept of negative capability can be understood as an author's ability to remain objective and emotionally detached in his or her representation of characters, objects, and actions.  In his essay “Tradition and the Individual Talent,” T. S. Eliot wrote, “the progress of an artist is a continual self-sacrifice, a continual extinction of personality.” According to this line of interpretation, the author negates himself, his own desires and passions, in order to present a fully independent character, one with all the uncertainty and mutability of a real person.

Use of the word 'negative'
In the same way that chameleons are 'negative' for colour, Keatsian poets are negative for self and identity: they change their identity with each subject they inhabit. This is a kind of personal Tao, and like the cosmic Tao, negative capability can be difficult to grasp because it is not a name for a thing but rather a way of feeling or of knowing. This intuitive knowing of the inner life of, for example, a nightingale or a Grecian urn, cannot be grasped as a concept; as with Tao, it is known through actual living experience of one's everyday changeable being. This capability depends on being negative to what Keats called 'consequitive reasoning'. In this sense, the word 'negative' is defined in opposition to the positivism prevalent at the time.

Another explanation of the word negative relies on hypothesising that Keats was influenced in his studies of medicine and chemistry, and that it refers to the negative pole of an electric current which is passive and receptive. In the same way that the negative pole receives the current from the positive pole, the poet receives impulses from a world that is full of mystery and doubt, which cannot be explained but which the poet can translate into art.

Modern psychological experiments demonstrate that if a composing poet is placed in a functional magnetic resonance imager (fMRI), the initial stage of poetic inspiration relates to something negative: the attenuation of self-monitoring and top-down attention, related to decreases in executive control mediated by deactivation of the dorsolateral prefrontal cortex (DLPFC). In this sense, Keats might be seen as providing an antidote to E. M. Forster's mantra of 'Only connect...'. Keats might be seen as saying 'Only disconnect...' from our reassuring certainties, from our hyperconnected world, from our executive control, and from our prefrontal cortex. 'O for a Life of Sensations rather than of Thoughts!' is how Keats expressed this in a letter to Benjamin Bailey in 1817.

Contrasted with positive capability
When humans are presented with external stress, the autonomic nervous system provides them with a 'fight or flight' response. This seems like a binary choice, but Keats provides a third option. Fight or flight has been called positive capability, and teachers of mindfulness stress the importance of cultivating negative capability in order to overcome and provide an alternative to our routine reactions to stress. They point out that this teaches tolerance of uncertainty, and enriches decision making. It may not be productive to discuss whether negative or positive capability is more important, as they are analogous to the poles of a battery: a battery is only a battery if it has both positive and negative terminals.

Importance
The sections below show that negative capability is not the exclusive preserve of poets, but can describe the pre-creative mood of any artist, scientist, or religious person. Negative capability is important as an explanation of how periods of indolence give rise to periods of creativity.

Competition (varieties of prepoetry)
Negative capability needs to be understood as just one of a number of moods that may compete in the poet's mind before the poem arrives—i.e. during the phase that may be called prepoetry, after the musical form of the same name which delights in 'uncertainties, mysteries, [and] doubts'. The only valid way to approach this subject is through the words of poets themselves, e.g.:

Emotion recollected in tranquility and wise passivity (e.g. Wordswoth)The systematic derangement of the senses (e.g. Rimbaud).Automatic writing and thought transference (e.g. Yeats).Frenzy (e.g. Shakespeare). 
The poet's eye, in fine frenzy rolling,Doth glance from heaven to earth, from earth to heaven;And as imagination bodies forth  forms of things unknown, the poet's pen Turns them to shapes and gives to airy nothing  A local habitation and a name.
<p align=right>(A Midsummer Night's Dream, Act V scene 1, from line 1841)

At one point Coleridge thought of the poet as Truth's Ventriloquist.

Miraculous nature
The above attempts to show how negative capability can inspire great poetry. It does not explain how this mood is then engendered in readers of that poetry. This is one of the miraculous features of Keats's poetry: miraculous in the sense that an engine would be miraculous if it took in a high-octane fuel and then produced more fuel of an even higher octane rather than exhaust. It is possible for a reader to listen to a great Ode, and to read an analysis of it, and still not be moved by it or to feel a sense of negative capability being transmitted. Patience is required, and travel: travel down Keats's winding mossy ways, along his realms of gold, and through labyrinths of suffering and loss. Then when such a traveller returns to the great Odes, their truth and beauty may be more fully appreciated.

There is one other way in which negative capability is miraculous. Poets have long likened their verse to great or sacred rivers,  and philosophers such as Heraclitus, from before the time of Socrates, have pointed out that "you can't step into the same river twice, because both you and the river change". Transience confers immortality and change confers identity. The river would not be a river if it did not change or flow. In this sense, the reader cannot step into the same Ode twice. When readers put aside their certainties and embrace change and 'uncertainties, mysteries, and doubts' they set themselves adrift in a drunken boat on this 'miraculous stream'. This current takes the reader down to a 'sunless sea' and a place 'under sleep where all the waters meet', i.e. towards a kind of negative capability, which is now seen to be both the origin and the destination of at least some great poetry. No poet has written his name more clearly or more transparently in these miraculous streams, rivers, and seas than the poet John Keats whose own self-written epitaph reads "Here lies One whose Name was writ in Water".

Unger: The thesis of negative capability
Roberto Mangabeira Unger appropriated Keats' term in order to explain resistance to rigid social divisions and hierarchies. For Unger, negative capability is the "denial of whatever in our contexts delivers us over to a fixed scheme of division and hierarchy and to an enforced choice between routine and rebellion." It is thus through negative capability that we can further empower ourselves against social and institutional constraints, and loosen the bonds that entrap us in a certain social station.

An example of negative capability can be seen at work in industrial innovation. In order to create an innovator's advantage and develop new forms of economic enterprise, the modern industrialist could not just become more efficient with surplus extraction based on pre-existing work roles, but rather needed to invent new styles of flexible labor, expertise, and capital management. The industrialist needed to bring people together in new and innovative ways and redefine work roles and workplace organization. The modern factory had to, at once, stabilize its productive environment by inventing new restraints upon labor, such as length of the work day and division of tasks, but at the same time could not be too severe or risk being at a disadvantage to competitors, e.g. not being able to shift production tasks or capacity. Those industrialists and managers who were able to break old forms of organizational arrangements exercised negative capability.

This thesis of negative capability is a key component in Unger's theory of false necessity and formative context. The theory of false necessity claims that our social worlds are the artifact of our own human endeavors. There is no pre-set institutional arrangement that our societies adhere to, and there is no necessary historical mold of development that they will follow. Rather we are free to choose and develop the forms and the paths that our societies will take through a process of conflicts and resolutions. However, there are groups of institutional arrangements that work together to bring out certain institutional forms, liberal democracy, for example. These forms are the basis of a social structure, and which Unger calls formative contexts. In order to explain how we move from one formative context to another without the conventional social theory constraints of historical necessity (e.g. feudalism to capitalism), and to do so while remaining true to the key insight of individual human empowerment and anti-necessitarian social thought, Unger recognized that there are an infinite number of ways of resisting social and institutional constraints, which can lead to an infinite number of outcomes. This variety of forms of resistance and empowerment (i.e. negative capability) make change possible.

This thesis of negative capability addresses the problem of agency in relation to structure. It recognizes the constraints of structure and its molding influence upon the individual, but at the same time finds the individual able to resist, deny, and transcend their context. Unlike other theories of structure and agency, negative capability does not reduce the individual to a simple actor possessing only the dual capacity of compliance or rebellion, but rather sees him as able to partake in a variety of activities of self empowerment.

Bion
The twentieth-century British psychoanalyst Wilfred Bion elaborated on Keats's term to illustrate an attitude of openness of mind which he considered of central importance, not only in the psychoanalytic session, but in life itself. For Bion, negative capability was the ability to tolerate the pain and confusion of not knowing, rather than imposing ready-made or omnipotent certainties upon an ambiguous situation or emotional challenge. His idea has been taken up more widely in the British Independent School, as well as elsewhere in psychoanalysis and psychotherapy.

Lyacos: Negative capability and the social outcasts
Greek author Dimitris Lyacos considers people living "in the margins" as possessing the negative capability that permits them to cross boundaries and, by accepting "the burden of the mystery", explore uncertainty and the flux of life against western norms and structures. In an interview in Berfrois Magazine Lyacos notes: "We carry with us a backpack of ideas, theories, insecurities and the detailed scenarios we project onto the future. Unlike us, outcasts, fugitives and people in the margins are the ones possessing the negative capability, the power to bear the "burden of the mystery"; immigrants cross seas that might engulf them. Their fear is overcome not only by the hope of a better life but also by their acceptance of those darker alleys, where time and space are created at the moment in which they are experienced."

In the context of Zen 
The notion of negative capability has been associated with Zen philosophy.  Keats' man of negative capability had qualities that enabled him to "lose his self-identity, his 'imaginative identification' with and submission to things, and his power to achieve a unity with life". The Zen concept of satori is the outcome of passivity and receptivity, culminating in "sudden insight into the character of the real".  Satori is reached without deliberate striving. The antecedent stages to satori: quest, search, ripening and explosion. The "quest" stage is accompanied by a strong feeling of uneasiness, resembling the capacity to practice negative capability while the mind is in a state of "uncertainties, mysteries and doubts". In the explosive stage (akin to Keats' 'chief intensity'), a man of negative capability effects a "fellowship with essence".

In film, poems, songs, and popular culture
Keats's concept of negative capability was little known except to scholars, poets, and other careful readers, until 2 November 2018 when the British singer-songwriter Marianne Faithfull released her album entitled Negative Capability. Then, on 15 November 2020, the BBC aired the second installment of the second series of His Dark Materials based on the trilogy by Philip Pullman, of the same name. Here the idea of negative capability is given great prominence, in what for the BBC was its most lavish production to date. It is presented not as an idea or a theory or a concept or a thesis, but as a mood which the heroine Lyra is able to sink into, and which enables her especial ability to read the rare and beautiful and truth-telling alethiometer.  This device, like a nightingale, issues a code that cannot be understood by purely reductive means. Its beauty is part of its truth. Lyra visits the Dark Materials Research Laboratory where she meets the chief researcher, Mary Malone, who, has the uncanny ability to see particles of dark matter, if she puts herself in the right mood. She tells Lyra "you can't see them unless you put your mind in a certain state. Do you know the poet John Keats? He has a phrase for it: negative capability. You have to hold your mind in a state of expectation without impatience..." The implication is that Keats's nightingale is his alethiometer, whose truth, like the truth of poetry itself, is not amenable to any amount of vivisection. Philip Pullman has written that 'many poems are interrogated until they confess, and what they confess is usually worthless, as the results of torture always are: broken little scraps of information, platitudes, banalities'. But if we can follow Lyra and Mary Malone, and put ourselves in the right mood, the dark materials between the lines may become visible or audible. This is the nightingale's code referred to in popular songs such as in one alternate-take version of Bob Dylan's Visions of Johanna and also in the song of the woodthrush in TS Eliot's poem Marina. In the latter's case 'where all the waters meet' is a neat confirmation of the negative polarity view of negative capability alluded to above. It is as if the poet's mind is the negative terminal or the sinkhole in which everything meets and is reconciled. The negativity here depends on the self abnegation of the poet, and its that which allows the current to flow.

Perhaps the darkest evocation of the mood of negative capability in popular culture comes from Bob Dylan's song "Not Dark Yet" which is best listened to rather than read. Bob Dylan has famously been called 'Keats with a guitar' by the New York Times and others, and this song shows their close affinity through contiguous explorations of their respective negative capabilities.

In 2013 jazz guitarist Bern Nix released an album titled Negative Capability, containing liner notes explaining Keats definition.

Criticism
Stanley Fish has expressed strong reservations about the attempt to apply the concept of negative capability to social contexts. He criticized Unger's early work as being unable to chart a route for the idea to pass into reality, which leaves history closed and the individual holding onto the concept while kicking against air. Fish finds the capability Unger invokes in his early works unimaginable and unmanufacturable that can only be expressed outright in blatant speech, or obliquely in concept. More generally, Fish finds the idea of radical culture as an oppositional ideal in which context is continuously refined or rejected impracticable at best, and impossible at worst. Unger has addressed these criticisms by developing a full theory of historical process in which negative capability is employed.

In The Life in the Sonnets, David Fuller makes use of negative capability in addressing the qualities and potential of writing literary criticism. A critic's experience and feelings altogether form a strong framework to expand one's ability in critical thinking, while negative capability replaces the notion of correctness in analyzing literary texts.

See also

Notes

Further reading
 A. C. Bradley, 'The Letters of Keats' in Oxford Lectures on Poetry (1965[1909])
 W.J. Bate, Negative Capability: The Intuitive Approach in Keats. Intro by Maura Del Serra (New York: Contra Mundum Press, 2012).
 S. Fish, "Unger and Milton", in Doing What Comes Naturally (1989): 339–435.
 Li Ou, Keats and Negative Capability (2009)
 
 
 Wigod, Jacob D. 1952. "Negative Capability and Wise Passiveness". Publications of the Modern Language Association of America. 67 (4): 383–390.

Social concepts
Skills